Ďurkovce is a village and municipality in the Veľký Krtíš District of the Banská Bystrica Region of southern Slovakia.

History
In historical records, the village was first mentioned in 1262 (1262 Gurky, 1351 Gyiörk, 1381 Gyurk, Gyurki). In 1351, it belonged to Vinica town and, successively, to nobles Gyürkiy, a local feudatory family, Teleky and Majthény. In the 16th century, it was destroyed by Turks. From 1938 to 1945, it belonged to Hungary.

Genealogical resources

The records for genealogical research are available at the state archive "Statny Archiv in Banska Bystrica, Slovakia"

 Roman Catholic church records (births/marriages/deaths): 1735-1904 (parish B)

See also
 List of municipalities and towns in Slovakia

External links
Statistical Office of the Slovak Republic 
English version
http://www.e-obce.sk 
English version
Surnames of living people in Durkovce

Villages and municipalities in Veľký Krtíš District